Merinos is a village in the south of Paysandú Department of western Uruguay.

Geography
The railroad track joining Paysandú with Paso de los Toros passes through the village.

History
Its status was elevated to "Pueblo" (village) by the Act of Ley Nº 16.232 on 19 November 1991.

Population
In 2011 Merinos had a population of 528.
 
Source: Instituto Nacional de Estadística de Uruguay

References

External links
INE map of Merinos

Populated places in the Paysandú Department